Chileulia yerbalocae is a species of moth of the family Tortricidae. It is found in Santiago, Chile.

The wingspan is 18–22 mm. The ground colour of the forewings is white with grey suffusions and with blackish grey strigulae (fine streaks) and dots. The markings are grey dotted, strigulated and edged with blackish. The hindwings are greyish suffused with brownish in the postmedian half.

Etymology
The species name refers to the type locality, Yerba Loca.

References

Moths described in 2010
Euliini
Moths of South America
Taxa named by Józef Razowski
Endemic fauna of Chile